Elvan M. George (September 1, 1912 – June 21, 1974) was an American football coach. He is known for coaching East Central University in Ada, Oklahoma from 1959 to 1971. Prior to that, he served as head coach at Ada High School in Ada, Oklahoma where his teams won six state championships—1951, 1952, and 1954 to 1957. He is considered one of the most influential figures in Oklahoma sports history.

Head coaching record

College

References

External links
 

1912 births
1974 deaths
East Central Tigers football coaches
East Central Tigers football players
High school football coaches in Oklahoma
People from Hopkins County, Texas